The Evans Heights are small rock heights on the west side of the mouth of Woodberry Glacier, in the Prince Albert Mountains of Victoria Land. They were mapped by the United States Geological Survey from surveys and U.S. Navy air photos, 1956–62, and were named by the Advisory Committee on Antarctic Names for John P. Evans, a field assistant at McMurdo Station, 1964–65.

References 

Mountains of Victoria Land
Scott Coast